Walter Montgomery (November 8, 1895 – October 10, 1950) was a Canadian wrestler. He competed in the freestyle lightweight event at the 1924 Summer Olympics.

References

1895 births
1950 deaths
Olympic wrestlers of Canada
Wrestlers at the 1924 Summer Olympics
Canadian male sport wrestlers
Sportspeople from Pembroke, Ontario
Sportspeople from Ontario
20th-century Canadian people